Christmas with Glen Campbell is the fifty-fifth album by American singer/guitarist Glen Campbell, released in 1995 (see 1995 in music).

Track listing
 "Santa Claus Is Coming to Town" (J. Fred Coots, Haven Gillespie) – 2:14
 "Winter Wonderland" (Felix Bernard, Dick Smith) – 2:45
 "White Christmas" (Irving Berlin) – 2:46
 "Sleigh Ride"  (Leroy Anderson, Mitchell Parish) – 2:51
 "God Rest Ye Merry Gentlemen" (arr. by T. J. Kuenster) – 1:58
 "Frosty the Snowman" (S. Nelson, J. Rollins) – 2:38
 "Jingle Bell Rock" (Joe Beal, Jim Boothe) – 1:51
 "Here Comes Santa Claus" (Gene Autry, Oakley Haldeman) – 1:36
 "Let It Snow! Let It Snow! Let It Snow!" (Sammy Cahn, Jule Styne) – 2:22
 "Do You Hear What I Hear?" (Noël Regney, Gloria Shayne Baker) – 3:52
 "I Saw Three Ships" (arr. by T. J. Kuenster) – 3:41

Personnel
Glen Campbell – vocals, acoustic guitar, electric guitar, bagpipes
T.J. Kuenster – Kurzweil digital grand piano, backing vocals
Jeff Dayton – electric guitar, acoustic guitar, backing vocals
Gary Bruzzese – drums, percussion, backing vocals
Ken Skaggs – mandolin, steel guitar
Russell Skaggs – bass guitar
Noel Kirkland – electric guitar
Ron Rutowski – fiddle, banjo

Production
Producer – T.J. Kuenster
Engineer/co-producer – Jeff Wyatt
Co-engineer – Mike Frazier
Production Coordinator – Bill Maclay
Cover – Lotta Lannerheim
Photo – Sandra Ann Gillard
Digitally recorded and mixed at the Glen Campbell Goodtime Theatre and Caravell Recording Studio, Branson, MO
 Digitally mastered by Paul Tavenner at Blue Nile Recording Studio, Burbank, CA

1995 Christmas albums
Christmas albums by American artists
Glen Campbell albums
Country Christmas albums